Danny or Daniel Price may refer to:

 Danny Price (baseball coach), American baseball coach
 Danny Price (boxer) (born 1985), British boxer
 Daniel Buckner Price (1975–2003), American artist
 Daniel Price (priest) (died 1706), Dean of St Asaph